The 1979 European Cup final was a football match held at the Olympiastadion, Munich, on 30 May 1979. Trevor Francis scored the only goal of the match, as Nottingham Forest of England defeated Malmö FF of Sweden 1–0 to become European champions for the first time in club history. The win represented a third successive victory for an English side in the European Cup, after Liverpool's victories in 1977 and 1978.

Background
The competition had provided many great stories and had thrown up a final that no-one could have predicted when it had started the previous August. Unfortunately, with two of their best players – midfielder Bo Larsson and defender Roy Andersson – already ruled out with injury and with their captain and key midfielder, Staffan Tapper, breaking his toe in training on the eve of the final, Malmö resorted to the same defensive tactics that Belgian team Club Bruges had used at Wembley in the final twelve months earlier. With neither of the finalists being one of Europe’s major clubs, Munich’s Olympiastadion was far from full for the Final, and the game itself was something of an anti-climax. There was, however, one memorable story still to be told. Back in February, Brian Clough had elected to spend the money that Forest had made from winning the league title in 1978 on a forward from Birmingham City. Clough made Trevor Francis Britain’s first £1 million footballer when he took him to Nottingham, but UEFA rules stipulated that he could not play European football for another three months. Therefore, the first game that Francis was eligible for was the final itself and, with Martin O'Neill injured and Archie Gemmill not selected by Clough, Francis was picked to play his first ever European club game, albeit out on the right wing.

Route to the final

Match summary
With Malmö opting to sit back in defence for the duration of the match, the game was merely about whether Forest could break through. Despite constant pressure, the English side had still failed to score as first half injury time began, but then John Robertson, a man who was now one of the most feared wingers in European football, beat two Swedish defenders on the left hand side before whipping in a cross. Goalkeeper Jan Möller, who had been solid up to this point, did not come out to clear the ball, and at the far post was none other than Trevor Francis to head the ball into the roof of the net. That was effectively the end of the match. Both Garry Birtles and Robertson missed good chances in the second half, but it did not matter, as Malmö never looked likely to score.

It may have been an unremarkable final, but the result certainly made for a remarkable overall story. Under their maverick manager Brian Clough, Nottingham Forest – a relatively small English club – had won European club football’s biggest prize, knocking out two-time defending champions Liverpool along the way. Just two years earlier, Forest had been in English football's second tier, and yet they now found themselves at the zenith of European club football.

Nottingham Forest would retain their title the following year.

Match

Details

See also
1978–79 European Cup
Malmö FF in European football
Nottingham Forest F.C. in European football

Notes

References

External links
1978–79 season at UEFA.com

1
European Cup Final
European Cup Final
European Cup Final 1979
European Cup Final 1979
UEFA Champions League finals
International club association football competitions hosted by Germany
European Cup Final
1970s in Munich
European Cup Final
Sports competitions in Munich
European Cup Final